The Oakland Spiders are a professional ultimate team based in Oakland, California. The Spiders are members of the West Division of the American Ultimate Disc League (AUDL). The team was founded as the San Jose Spiders in 2014 when the league expanded to the west coast, and played under that name until moving to Oakland in 2022. The Spiders won the national championship in their first season and became the first team in AUDL history to win consecutive titles when they defeated the Madison Radicals in the 2015 championship game.

References

Sports teams in Oakland, California
2014 establishments in California
Ultimate teams established in 2014